The Poverty Point culture is the archaeological culture of a prehistoric indigenous peoples who inhabited a portion of North America's lower Mississippi Valley and surrounding Gulf coast from about 1730 – 1350 BC.

Archeologists have identified more than 100 sites belonging to this mound-builder culture, who also formed a large trading network throughout much of the eastern part of what is now the United States.

History

Preceding the Poverty Point Culture is the Watson Brake site in present-day Ouachita Parish, Louisiana, where eleven earthwork mounds were built beginning about 3500 BC.  Watson Brake is one of the earliest mound complexes in the Americas.  Next oldest is the Poverty Point Culture, which thrived from 1730 - 1350 BC, during the late Archaic period in North America. Evidence of this mound builder culture has been found at more than 100 sites, including the Jaketown Site near Belzoni, Mississippi. The largest and best-known site is at Poverty Point, located on the Macon Ridge near present-day Epps, Louisiana. The culture is named for the  archeological site, which is in turn named after a 19th century cotton plantation built in the area.

The Poverty Point culture may have hit its peak around 1500 BC. It is one of the oldest complex cultures, and possibly the first tribal culture in the Mississippi Delta and in the present-day United States.

Poverty Point culture was followed by the Tchefuncte and Lake Cormorant cultures of the Tchula period, a local manifestation of the Early Woodland period.  These descendant cultures differed from Poverty Point culture in trading over shorter distances, creating less massive public projects, completely adopting ceramics for storage and cooking, and lacking a lapidary (stone-carving) industry.

Earthworks

Although the earthworks at Poverty Point are not the oldest in the United States (those at Watson Brake were built about 1900 years earlier), they are notable as the oldest earthworks of this size in the Western Hemisphere. Archeologists believe the plaza was the site of public ceremonies, rituals, dances, games and other major community activities.

The site has six concentric earthworks separated by ditches, or swales, where dirt was removed to build the ridges. Many years of plowing have reduced some to only  in height. Archeologists believe that the homes of 500 to 1,000 inhabitants were located on these ridges.

It was the largest settlement at that time in North America.

On the western side of the plaza, archeologists have found some unusually deep pits. One explanation is these holes once held huge wooden posts, which served as calendar markers. Using the sun’s shadows, the inhabitants could have predicted the changing of the seasons. This great building project demanded a sustained investment of human labor, and the organized skill and cultural will to sustain the effort over many centuries. That would mean 1,350 adults laboring 70 days a year for three years.

Artifacts

Archeological excavation has revealed a wealth of artifacts, including animal effigy figures; hand-molded, baked-clay cooking objects; simple thick-walled pottery; stone vessels, spear points, adzes, hoes, drills, edge-retouched flakes, and blades. Stone cooking balls were used to prepare meals. Scholars believe dozens of the cooking balls were heated in a bonfire and dropped in pits along with food. Different-shaped balls controlled cooking temperatures and cooking time.

Crude human figures, forming another category of artifacts, are thought to have been used for religious purposes. Points made of imported gray Midwestern flint were also found. In addition, plummets were fashioned out of heavy iron ore imported from Hot Springs, Arkansas; they served as weights for fish nets.

The Poverty Point culture developed a tradition of making high-quality, stylized, carved and polished miniature stone beads.  Other early cultures in eastern North America rarely used stone to make their beads, opting for softer materials such as shell or bone. The beads depict animals common to the Poverty Point culture's environment, such as owls, dogs, locusts, and turkey vultures.

See also

 Archaeological periods of the Mississippi Valley

References

External links
 Louisiana’s Poverty Point Earthworks Show Early Native Americans Were ‘Incredible Engineers’, Smithsonian magazine news item, September 8, 2021

 
Mound builders (people)
Archaic period in North America
Archaeological cultures of North America
22nd-century BC establishments
7th-century BC disestablishments